Bobbie Ann Mason (born May 1, 1940) is an American novelist, short story writer, essayist, and literary critic from Kentucky. Her memoir was a finalist for the Pulitzer Prize.

Early life and education
A child of Wilburn and Christina Mason, Bobbie Ann Mason grew up on her family's dairy farm outside of Mayfield, Kentucky with four siblings and her great niece Mya Mason.  As a child she loved to read with encouragement from her parents; however, choices were limited.  These books were mostly popular fiction about the Bobbsey Twins and the Nancy Drew mysteries. She would later write a book about these books she read in adolescence titled The Girl Sleuth: A feminist guide to the Bobbsey Twins, Nancy Drew, and Their Sisters. Mason credits her time at a grade school in Cuba, Kentucky with influencing her adult fictional characters.

After high school, Mason went on to major in English at the University of Kentucky. After graduating in 1962, she worked for a fan magazine publisher in New York City, writing articles about various stars who were in the spotlight for movie magazines that Mason describes as "fluff." She earned her master's degree at the State University of New York at Binghamton in 1966.  Next she went to graduate school at the University of Connecticut, where she subsequently received her Ph.D. in literature with a dissertation on Vladimir Nabokov's Ada in 1972. Her dissertation was published as Nabokov's Garden two years later while Mason taught at Mansfield State College (now Mansfield University).

Career
By the time she was in her late thirties, Mason started to write short stories. In 1980, The New Yorker published her first story. "It took me a long time to discover my material", she said. "It wasn't a matter of developing writing skills, it was a matter of knowing how to see things.  And it took me a very long time to grow up. I'd been writing for a long time, but was never able to see what there was to write about. I always aspired to things away from home, so it took me a long time to look back at home and realize that that's where the center of my thought was." Mason has written about the working-class people of Western Kentucky, and her short stories have contributed to a renaissance of regional fiction in America creating a literary style that critics have labeled "shopping mall realism."

Mason then went on to write a collection of short stories, Shiloh and Other Stories. In 1985, she published her first novel, In Country, which eventually was made into a feature film (see below). She followed In Country with another novel in 1988, Spence and Lila. She has since published several more short story collections (see below). In 2016, Mason became the second living author to be inducted into the Kentucky Writers Hall of Fame.

Mason's dissertation, a critique of Vladimir Nabokov's Ada or Ardor, was published in 1974. A year later, she published The Girl Sleuth, a feminist assessment of Nancy Drew, the Bobbsey Twins, and other fictional girl detectives. Mason's first volume of short stories, Shiloh and Other Stories, appeared in 1982 and won the 1983 Ernest Hemingway Foundation Award for outstanding first works of fiction. Mason's novel In Country is often cited as one of the seminal literary works of the 1980s. Its protagonist attempts to come to terms with a number of important generational issues, ranging from the Vietnam War to consumer culture. A film version was produced in 1989, starring Emily Lloyd as the protagonist and Bruce Willis as her uncle.

Her short stories have appeared in numerous magazines, including The Atlantic Monthly, Mother Jones, The New Yorker, and The Paris Review. Mason has received a National Endowment for the Arts Fellowship and a Guggenheim Fellowship. She was a writer in residence at the University of Kentucky until 2011. Her short story "Wish" appears in The Norton Anthology of Literature by Women. Patchwork: A Bobbie Ann Mason Reader was published in 2018.

Selected works

Short story collections
Shiloh and Other Stories (1982)
Love Life. Harper & Row, New York (1989)
Midnight Magic (1998)
Zigzagging Down a Wild Trail (2002)
Nancy Culpepper (2006)

Novels
In Country (1985)
Feather Crowns (1993)
An Atomic Romance (2005)
The Girl in the Blue Beret (2011)
Dear Ann (2020)

Novella
Spence + Lila (1988)

Memoir
Clear Springs: A Memoir (1999) 

Biography
Elvis Presley (2002)

Criticism
 Nabokov's Garden (1974)
 The Girl Sleuth: A Feminist Guide (1975)

Awards
 PEN/Hemingway Award, 1983
 National Endowment for the Arts award, 1983
 Pennsylvania Arts Council grant, 1983, 1989
 Guggenheim Fellowship, 1984
 Kentucky Governor's Award in the Arts, 2012
 Kentucky Literary Award, 2004, 2012

References

Further reading
Price, Johanna, ''Understanding Bobbie Ann Mason, University of South Carolina Press, 2000
"Understanding" review by Barbara Marshall

External links
Author's website
"Facing Toward Home" 1999 interview
1995 answers by Mason to Kentucky high school students
A&S Hall of Fame 2015 interview, UK College of Arts & Sciences, Kentucky

1940 births
20th-century American novelists
21st-century American novelists
Living people
American women novelists
American women short story writers
Novelists from Kentucky
University of Kentucky alumni
Binghamton University alumni
People from Graves County, Kentucky
20th-century American women writers
21st-century American women writers
Hemingway Foundation/PEN Award winners
20th-century American short story writers
21st-century American short story writers
Writers of American Southern literature
PEN/Faulkner Award for Fiction winners
Kentucky women writers